The A1 motorway is a motorway in Serbia and at  it is the longest motorway in Serbia. It crosses the country from north to south, starting at the Horgoš border crossing with Hungary and ending at the Preševo border crossing with North Macedonia. As a part of the European route E75 and Pan-European corridor X, connecting 4 of 5 largest Serbian cities (Belgrade, Novi Sad, Niš and Subotica), it is the most vital part of the Serbian road network.

Route
Northern section
The northern section (Hungarian border – Subotica – Novi Sad – Belgrade) is 172 km long and was built between 1971 and 2013.

The first subsection of this section to be opened is the Belgrade (Batajnica) – Novi Sad stretch. It was built between 1971 and 1975, but only a single  carriageway was constructed at the time. It is 56.3 km long, and it includes the Beška Bridge (2,205 m) on the Danube river, which is the longest bridge on the Serbian road network. The next to open was the section between Novi Sad and Feketić, in 1986, 44.7 km long. Again, only one carriageway was constructed. Due to the breakup of Yugoslavia and the UN sanctions, motorway construction temporarily came to a halt. The next section to open was Feketić – Horgoš (border with Hungary), 71 km long. It was opened in 1997, and once again only the one (right) carriageway was constructed. After the right carriageway of the highway was complete, the construction of the left carriageway could start. The left carriageway between Batajnica and Beška was completed in 2004, and at this stage there was 32.2 km of a full-profile motorway. Construction continued, and the 19.1 km section from Beška to Novi Sad was completed in 2006. The next two sections were Novi Sad – Sirig and Žednik – Bikovo, both of them 10 km long; they opened in 2009. The first 5.5 km of the Novi Sad bypass were completed in 2010. In 2011 most of the motorway was upgraded to full-profile, with the completion of the 93 km sections Bikovo – Horgoš (border with Hungary), Sirig – Žednik and the twin Beška bridge. Finally, the remaining 2.5 km of the Novi Sad bypass were completed, which marked the end of construction of the northern section of the A1 motorway.

The motorway enters Serbia in Bačka and passes by Subotica, Bačka Topola, Vrbas, Novi Sad, crosses the Danube and enters Srem, passes by Inđija and Stara Pazova and arrives to Batajnica, a suburb of Belgrade, where the Belgrade bypass. begins. This part of the A1 motorway passes through Vojvodina, which is part of the Pannonian Basin. This is very flat terrain and the motorway is surrounded by fields. In the Novi Sad area, the motorway features local-express lanes, in order to avoid congestion in both directions.

Belgrade city motorway
The Belgrade city motorway is a 29 km long urban highway, which connects the A3 motorway and the A1 motorway, passing by the Belgrade Nikola Tesla Airport, Zemun, Novi Beograd, Voždovac and ending at Bubanj Potok. It was constructed in the 1970s and, until the completion of the Belgrade bypass, it is the only motorway connection between the northern and southern parts of the A1 motorway. After the completion of the Belgrade bypass this motorway will turn into the city's main urban thoroughfare.

Belgrade bypass

Part of A1 motroway is Belgrade bypass, from Batajnica to Bubanj Potok and it is 47.3 km long. Part from Batajnica to tunnel "Straževica" is completed and it is a full-profile motorway. Part from tunnel "Straževica" to Bubanj Potok interchange (sector 6) is 9.6km long and under construction. It is expected to be completed by June 2023.

Central section 
Central section (Belgrade–Niš) is 210 km-long and is completed in 1985.

First section of this part of A1 motorway was opened in 1977, and it was 28.1 km long section Beograd (Bubanj Potok) – Umčari, which was opened with another 12.5 kilometers of motorway through Belgrade from Mostar interchange to Bubanj Potok. Next year 79.3 kilometers from Umčari to Batočina were opened. Motorway was simultaneously constructed from Belgrade and from Niš, so in 1980 21.2 kilometers between Pojate and Deligrad were opened. In 1982 sections Batočina – Ćuprija and Deligrad – Niš were opened, and there was in total 189 kilometers between Belgrade and Niš. Last section was opened in 1985 and it was last 21 km between Ćuprija and Pojate.

Motorway goes through hilly terrain southern of Belgrade and then, near Smederevo enters the valley of Great Morava and later South Morava, passes by Jagodina, Ćuprija, Paraćin and Aleksinac and enters a basin near of Niš. Few km southwards Trupale interchange with A4 motorway which goes north of Niš, then passes Pirot, and goes to border with Bulgaria, while A1 motorway goes south by Južna Morava river.

Southern section 
Southern section (Niš–Leskovac–Vranje–North Macedonia border) is 154 km long. Construction of southern section started in 1992 and has only been completed and opened for traffic in 2019. First section of this part of A1 motorway was opened in 1992, and it was 13 km long section Niš – Batušinac. In 1997 year 23 kilometers from Batušinci to Pečenjevce were opened. Motorway construction continued in 2003 with the 23 km long subsection between Pečenjevce and Grabovnica which was completed in 2005. Next subsection to be opened to traffic was 21 km-long Levosoje – border with North Macedonia in 2013. New momentum came in 2014 when construction started on last remaining subsections (5.6 km-long Grabovnica – Grdelica, 26.1 km-long Grdelica – Vladičin Han, 26.3 km-long Vladičin Han – Donji Neradovac, 8 km-long Donji Neradovac – Srpska Kuća, and 8 km-long Srpska Kuća – Levosoje) and was in simultaneous construction from until 2019 when it was completed and this last remaining part of A1 motorway was opened to traffic.

Motorway passes through valley of South Morava, passes west of Niš, by Merošina and Leskovac, and through very difficult terrain of Grdelica Gorge. On this part of motorway through the Grdelica Gorge there are 33 bridges, of which Vrla bridge is longest (around 650 meters long and around 60 high), and two tunnels: "Predejane" (1,000 m) and "Manajle" (1,818 m) which is the longest tunnel in Serbia. Near Vladičin Han motorway leaves Grdelica gorge and passes by Vranje. Few kilometers south of Preševo motorway ends at Preševo border crossing with North Macedonia.

List of exits

Toll
The A1 is by and large a toll road, as are all motorways in Serbia. The toll is collected at entry and exit toll stations based on the distance travelled and the category of the vehicle. The toll sections are Subotica – Stara Pazova, Belgrade (Vrčin) – Preševo, while the Belgrade bypass section and short stretches immediately adjoining it are toll-free.

Gallery

See also
 National Road (M)1

References

Sources
 
 Putevi Srbije P.E.
 Koridori Srbije P.E.

External links

 Regulation of State Roads

Motorways in Serbia
North Banat District
North Bačka District
South Bačka District
Srem District
Transport in Belgrade
Podunavlje District
Šumadija District
Pomoravlje District
Rasina District
Nišava District
Jablanica District
Pčinja District